Aaron R. Parsons (born 28 August 1980) is an astrophysicist who works primarily in the fields of radio astronomy instrumentation and experimental cosmology.

Biography 

Parsons was born in 1980.  He grew up in Rangely, Colorado and graduated simultaneously from high school and from Colorado Northwestern Community College with an AS degree in 1998.  He majored in physics and mathematics at Harvard University, and graduated with a BA in 2002.
After working as a development engineer at the UC Berkeley Space Sciences Lab from 2002 to 2004, Parsons entered graduate school at the University of California, Berkeley in astronomy, receiving his PhD in 2009 while holding a predoctoral research position at Arecibo Observatory in Puerto Rico.  Parsons returned to UC Berkeley on an NSF postdoctoral fellowship in 2009.  He was hired as an assistant professor in the Astronomy Department and in the Radio Astronomy Laboratory at UC Berkeley in 2011.

Research 
Parsons is the Principal Investigator of the Precision Array for Probing the Epoch of Reionization (PAPER) array, a radio interferometer designed to detect the first era of star formation, commonly called the Epoch of Reionization, via its effect on hydrogen in the intergalactic medium.  He specializes in digital signal processing instrumentation, and was one of the founding members of the Center for Astronomy Signal Processing and Electronics Research (CASPER).

Honors 
 Charles Townes Fellow (2008)
 NSF Astronomy & Astrophysics Fellow (2009)
  Mary Elizabeth Uhl Prize (2009)
Presidential Early Career Award for Scientists and Engineers (2019)

References 

Living people
American cosmologists
21st-century American astronomers
University of California, Berkeley faculty
1980 births
Harvard College alumni
21st-century American physicists
People from Rangely, Colorado
University of California, Berkeley alumni